Martin John Bryant (born 7 May 1967) is a convicted Australian mass shooter who murdered 35 people and injured 23 others in the Port Arthur massacre, one of the world's deadliest shooting sprees, in Port Arthur, Tasmania, between 28 and 29 April 1996. He is serving 35 life sentences, plus 1,652 years, all without the possibility of parole, at Risdon Prison in Hobart.

Early life
Martin Bryant was born on 7 May 1967 at the Queen Alexandra Hospital in Hobart, Tasmania. He was the first child of Maurice and Carleen Bryant. Although the family home was in Lenah Valley, Bryant spent some of his childhood at their beach home in Carnarvon Bay. In a 2011 interview, his mother recalled that while Bryant was very young, she would often find his toys broken and that he was an "annoying" and "different" child. A psychologist's view was that Bryant would never be capable of holding down a job as he would aggravate people to such an extent that he would always be in trouble.

Locals recall abnormal behaviour by Bryant, such as pulling the snorkel from another boy while diving and cutting down trees on a neighbour's property. He was described by teachers as being distant from reality and unemotional. At school, Bryant was a disruptive and sometimes violent child who suffered severe bullying by other children. After he was suspended from New Town Primary School in 1977, psychological assessments noted that he tortured animals. Bryant returned to school the following year with improved behaviour; however, he persisted in teasing younger children. He was transferred to a special education unit at New Town High School in 1980, where he deteriorated both academically and behaviourally throughout his remaining school years.

Psychological and psychiatric assessments 
Descriptions of Bryant's behaviour as an adolescent show that he continued to be disturbed and outlined the possibility of an intellectual disability. When leaving school in 1983, he was assessed for a disability pension by a psychiatrist who wrote: "Cannot read or write. Does a bit of gardening and watches TV ... Only his parents' efforts prevent further deterioration. Could be schizophrenic and parents face a bleak future with him." Bryant received a disability pension, though he also worked as a handyman and gardener. In an examination after the massacre, forensic psychiatrist Ian Joblin found Bryant to be borderline mentally disabled with an I.Q. of 66, equivalent to an 11-year-old.

While awaiting trial, Bryant was examined by court-appointed psychiatrist Ian Sale, who was of the opinion that Bryant "could be regarded as having shown a mixture of conduct disorder, attention deficit hyperactivity and a condition known as Asperger syndrome". Psychiatrist Paul Mullen, hired at the request of Bryant's legal counsel, found that Bryant was socially and intellectually impaired. Furthermore, finding that he did not display signs of schizophrenia or a mood disorder, Mullen concluded, "Though Mr. Bryant was clearly a distressed and disturbed young man, he was not mentally ill."

Adulthood 
In early 1987, when Bryant was 19, he met 54 year-old Helen Mary Elizabeth Harvey, heiress to a share in the Tattersall's lottery fortune, while looking for new customers for his lawnmowing service. Harvey, who lived with her mother Hilza, befriended Bryant, who became a regular visitor to her neglected mansion in New Town and assisted with tasks such as feeding the fourteen dogs living inside the house and the forty cats living inside her garage. In June 1990, an anonymous person reported Harvey to the health authorities and medics found both Harvey and her mother in need of urgent hospital treatment. With Helen suffering from infected ulcers and Hilza with an untreated broken hip, Hilza Harvey was moved into a nursing home and died several weeks later at the age of 79.

A cleanup order was placed on the decaying mansion and Bryant's father took long-service leave to assist in cleaning the interior. The local RSPCA unit had to confiscate many animals living in the house. Following the mandatory cleanup Harvey now invited Bryant to live with her in the mansion and they began spending extravagant amounts of money, which included the purchase of more than thirty new cars in less than three years. The odd pair of friends began to spend most days shopping, usually after having lunch in a local restaurant. Around this time, Bryant was reassessed for his pension and a note was attached to the paperwork: "Father protects him from any occasion which might upset him as he continually threatens violence ... Martin tells me he would like to go around shooting people. It would be unsafe to allow Martin out of his parents' control".

In 1991, as a result of no longer being allowed to have animals at the house, Harvey and Bryant moved together onto a  farm called Taurusville that she had purchased in Copping, a small township. Neighbours recalled that Bryant always carried an air gun and often fired it at tourists as they stopped to buy apples at a stall on the highway and that late at night he would roam through the surrounding properties firing the gun at dogs when they barked at him. They avoided him "at all costs" despite his attempts to befriend them.

On 20 October 1992, Harvey was killed when her car veered onto the wrong side of the road and hit an oncoming car directly. Bryant was inside the vehicle at the time of the accident and was hospitalised for seven months with severe neck and back injuries. He was briefly investigated by police for the role he played in the accident, as Bryant had a known habit of lunging for the steering wheel and Harvey had already had three accidents as a result. She often told people that this was the reason she never drove faster than 60 kilometres an hour (37 mph). Bryant was named the sole beneficiary of Harvey's will and came into possession of assets totaling more than AU$550,000. As Bryant had only the "vaguest notions" of financial matters, his mother subsequently applied for and was granted a guardianship order, placing Bryant's assets under the management of Public Trustees. The order was based on evidence of Bryant's diminished intellectual capacity.

After Harvey's death, Bryant's father Maurice looked after the Copping farm. Bryant returned to the family home to convalesce after leaving hospital. Maurice had been prescribed antidepressants and had discreetly transferred his joint bank account and utilities into his wife's name. Two months later, on 14 August 1993, a visitor looking for Maurice at the Copping property found a note saying "call the police" pinned to the door and found several thousand dollars in his car. The rates officer at the time found no reason to suspect criminal intent and sent council members and police to quell the stresses put forward by letters sent to the local council chambers. Police searched the property for Maurice without success. Divers were called in to search the four dams on the property, and on 16 August, his body was found in the dam closest to the farmhouse, with a diving weight belt around his neck. Police described the death as "unnatural" and it was ruled a suicide. Bryant inherited the proceeds of his father's superannuation fund, valued at AU$250,000.

Bryant later sold the Copping farm for AU$143,000 and kept the New Town mansion. While living at Copping, the white overalls he habitually wore were replaced with clothing more in line with Harvey's financial status. Now that he was alone, Bryant's dress became more bizarre; he often wore a grey linen suit, cravat, lizard-skin shoes, and a Panama hat while carrying a briefcase during the day, telling anyone who would listen that he had a well-paying career. He often wore an electric-blue suit with flared trousers and a ruffled shirt to the restaurant he frequented. The restaurant owner recalled: "It was horrible. Everyone was laughing at him, even the customers. I really felt suddenly quite sorry for him. I realised this guy didn't really have any friends."

With both his father and friend Harvey dead, Bryant became increasingly lonely. From 1993 to late 1995, he visited various overseas countries fourteen times and a summary of his domestic airline travel filled three pages. Bryant had felt lonely traveling as he did back home in Tasmania. He enjoyed the flights, as he could speak to the people sitting adjacent to him who had no choice but to be polite. He later took great joy in describing some of the more successful conversations he had with fellow passengers.

In late 1995, Bryant became suicidal after deciding he had "had enough". He stated, "I just felt more people were against me. When I tried to be friendly toward them, they just walked away." Although he had previously been little more than a social drinker, Bryant's alcohol consumption increased and, although he had not consumed any alcohol on the day of the Port Arthur massacre, had especially escalated in the six months prior to that day. His average daily consumption was estimated at half a bottle of Sambuca and a bottle of Baileys Irish Cream, supplemented with port wine and other sweet alcoholic drinks. According to Bryant, he thought the plan for Port Arthur might have first occurred to him four to twelve weeks before the event.

Port Arthur massacre 

Bryant has provided conflicting and confused accounts of what led him to kill 35 people at the Port Arthur site on 28 April 1996. It could have been his desire for attention, as he allegedly told a next-door neighbour, "I'll do something that will make everyone remember me." Bryant's defence psychiatrist Paul Mullen, former chief of forensic psychiatry at Monash University, said, "He followed Dunblane. His planning started with Dunblane. Before that he was thinking about suicide, but Dunblane and the early portrayal of the killer, Thomas Hamilton, changed everything."

Bryant's first victims, David and Noelene (Sally) Martin, owned the bed and breakfast guest house called 'Seascape'. The Martins had bought the bed and breakfast that Bryant's father had wanted to buy, and his father had complained to him on numerous occasions of the damage done to Bryant's family because of that purchase. Bryant apparently believed the Martins had bought the property to hurt his family out of spite and blamed the Martins for the depression that led to his father's suicide. He fatally shot the Martins in the guest house before travelling to the Port Arthur site.

At Port Arthur, Bryant entered the Broad Arrow Café on the grounds of the historic site, carrying a large blue duffel bag. Once he finished eating, Bryant moved toward the back of the café and set a video camera on a vacant table. He took out a Colt AR-15 SP1 Carbine (semi-automatic rifle) and, firing from the hip, began shooting patrons and staff. Within fifteen seconds, he had fired seventeen shots, killing twelve people and wounding ten. Bryant then walked to the other side of the shop and fired twelve more times, killing another eight people while wounding two. He then changed magazines before fleeing, shooting at people in the car park and from his yellow Volvo 244 car as he drove away; four were killed and an additional six were injured.

Bryant drove 300 metres down the road, to where a woman and her two children were walking. He stopped and fired two shots, killing the woman and the child she was carrying. The older child fled, but Bryant followed her and killed her with a single shot. He then stole a gold BMW by killing all four of its occupants. A short distance down the road, he stopped beside a couple in a white Toyota and, drawing his weapon, ordered the male occupant into the boot of the BMW. After shutting the boot, he fired two shots into the windscreen of the Toyota, killing the female driver.

Bryant returned to the guest house, set the stolen car alight and took his hostage inside where he had left the Martins' corpses. The police soon arrived and tried to negotiate with Bryant for many hours before the battery in the phone he was using ran out, ending communication. Bryant's only demand was to be transported in an army helicopter to an airport. During the negotiations, Bryant killed his hostage. The next morning, eighteen hours later, he set fire to the guest house and attempted to escape in the confusion. Suffering burns to his back and buttocks, Bryant was captured and taken to Royal Hobart Hospital, where he was treated and kept under heavy guard.

Imprisonment
Bryant was judged competent to stand trial, which was scheduled to begin on 7 November 1996. He initially pleaded not guilty but was persuaded by his court-appointed lawyer, John Avery, to plead guilty to all charges. Two weeks later, Hobart Supreme Court Judge William Cox gave Bryant 35 life sentences, plus 1,652 years in prison, without the possibility of parole, all of which is to be served concurrently; this life sentence being applied is "for the term of [his] natural life."

For the first eight months of his imprisonment, Bryant was held in a purpose-built special suicide-prevention cell in almost complete solitary confinement. He remained in protective custody for his own safety until 13 November 2006, when he was moved into Hobart's Wilfred Lopes Centre, a secure mental health unit run by the Tasmanian Department of Health and Human Services. The 35 bed unit for inmates with serious mental illness is staffed with doctors, nurses and other support workers. Inmates are not locked down and can come and go from their cells. Exterior security at the facility is provided by a three-wall perimeter patrolled by private contract guards. On 25 March 2007, Bryant attempted to end his life by slashing his wrist with a razor blade. On 27 March, he cut his throat with another razor blade and was hospitalised briefly.

As of January 2022, Bryant is housed in the maximum-security Risdon Prison near Hobart.

Media coverage
Newspaper coverage immediately after the Port Arthur massacre raised serious questions about journalistic practices, and criticism was directed toward Australian media. Photographs of Bryant published in The Australian had his eyes digitally manipulated with the effect of making him appear deranged and "glaring". Despite criticism, the manipulated photographs continued to be used in media reporting a decade later. There were also questions as to how the photos had been obtained.

The Tasmanian director of public prosecutions warned the media that the coverage compromised Bryant's right to a fair trial and writs were issued against The Australian, the Hobart Mercury (which used Bryant's picture under the headline "This is the man"), The Age and the ABC. The chairman of the Australian Press Council at the time, David Flint, argued that because Australian newspapers regularly ignored contempt-of-court provisions, this showed that the law, not the newspapers, needed change. Flint suggested that such a change in the law would not necessarily lead to trial by media. Australian newspapers also came under critical scrutiny of their accounts of Bryant and how the kind of identity responsible for his and other similar kinds of killing might be understood.

Political aftermath 
As a response to the spree killing, Australian state and territory governments placed extensive restrictions on all firearms, including semi-automatic centre-fire rifles, repeating shotguns (holding more than five shots) and high-capacity rifle magazines. In addition to this, limitations were also put into place on low-capacity repeating shotguns and rim-fire semi-automatic rifles. Though this resulted in stirring controversy, opposition to the new laws was overcome by media reporting of the massacre and mounting public opinion in the wake of the shootings (see Gun laws in Australia for more information on the 1996 legislation).

In popular culture
In March 2012, Sydney artist Rodney Pople controversially won the AU$35,000 Glover Prize for his landscape painting depicting Port Arthur with Bryant in the foreground holding a firearm.

In 2019, Bryant's massacre was referenced in the lyrics of the song, The Boys Are Killing Me on Pond's Tasmania album.

The 2021 film Nitram, directed by Justin Kurzel, is based on Bryant's life, with Caleb Landry Jones in the role of Bryant. Jones won the Cannes Film Festival Award for Best Actor for his portrayal.

See also
 List of rampage killers
 The Alannah and Madeline Foundation

References

External links
 
 
 

1967 births
Living people
20th-century Australian criminals
Australian mass murderers
Australian murderers of children
Australian people convicted of murder
Australian prisoners sentenced to multiple life sentences
Australian spree killers
People convicted of murder by Tasmania
People from Hobart
People with Asperger syndrome
People with antisocial personality disorder
People with intellectual disability
Port Arthur massacre
Prisoners sentenced to life imprisonment by Tasmania
Criminals from Tasmania